"Ay Vamos"  is a song performed by Colombian singer J Balvin, released as the lead single of the reissue of his second studio album, La Familia B Sides, by Universal Music Mexico on July 22, 2014.

It received a nomination for the Billboard Latin Music Award for Latin Rhythm Airplay Song of the Year in 2015. A remix, featuring French Montana and Nicky Jam was released on the Furious 7 soundtrack.

As of September 2022, the music video has received over 1.8 billion views on YouTube.

Track listing 
Digital download
 "Ay Vamos" –

Charts

Weekly charts

Year-end charts

Decade-end charts

Certifications

Awards and nominations

See also
List of Billboard number-one Latin songs of 2014

References 

2014 singles
J Balvin songs
Nicky Jam songs
Spanish-language songs
2014 songs
Universal Music Mexico singles
Number-one singles in Colombia
Number-one singles in the Dominican Republic
Latin Grammy Award for Best Urban Song
Songs written by J Balvin